Syrnola aurantiaca is a species of sea snail, a marine gastropod mollusk in the family Pyramidellidae, the pyrams and their allies.

Description
The rather thin, shining shell has a fulvous orange color, with a pale band at the suture. It is darker on the lower whorls, fading into white towards the apex. Its length measures 6 mm. The teleoconch contains eight whorls that are finely transversely striated. The  fold of the lip is very small and rudimentary.

Distribution
This marine species occurs off New South Wales, Australia. The type specimen was found off Port Jackson.

References

 Iredale, T. & McMichael, D. F. (1962). A reference list of the marine Mollusca of New South Wales. The Australian Museum, Sydney, Memoir. 11 : 1-185

External links
 Petterd W. F. (1884). Description of new Tasmanian shells. Journal of Conchology. 4(5): 135-145
  Laseron, C. F. (1951). The New South Wales Pyramidellidae and the genus Mathilda. Records of the Australian Museum. 22 (4): 298–334.

Pyramidellidae
Gastropods described in 1867